Gur-e Ganju (also Romanized as Gūr-e Ganjū and Gūr Ganjū; also known as Gowd-e Ganjū and Gūr Ganjeh) is a village in Tut-e Nadeh Rural District, in the Central District of Dana County, Kohgiluyeh and Boyer-Ahmad Province, Iran. At the 2006 census, its population was 469, in 100 families.

References 

Populated places in Dana County